India has developed its discourse on sexuality differently based on its distinct regions with their own unique cultures.

Background 
The seeming contradictions of Indian attitudes towards sex (more broadly – sexuality) can be best explained through the context of history. India played a role in shaping understandings of sexuality, and it could be argued that one of the first pieces of literature that treated "Kama" as science came from the Indian subcontinent. It may be argued that historically, India pioneered the use of sexual education through various art forms like sculptures, paintings, pieces of literature. As in all societies, there was a difference in sexual practices in India between common people and powerful rulers, with people in power often indulging in "self-gratification" lifestyles that were not representative of common moral attitudes. Moreover, there are distinct cultural differences seen through the course of history across India.

Ancient times 

The origins of the current Indian culture can be traced back to the Indus Valley civilisation, which was contemporaneous with the ancient Egyptian and Sumerian civilisations, around 2700 BCE. During this period, the first evidence of attitudes towards sex comes from the ancient texts of Hinduism. These ancient texts, the Rig Veda among few others, reveal moral perspectives on sexuality, marriage and fertility prayers. The epics of ancient India, the Ramayana and Mahabharata, which may have been first composed as early as 500 BCE, had a huge effect on the culture of Asia, influencing later Chinese, Japanese, Tibetan culture and South East Asian culture. These texts support the view that in ancient India, sex was considered a mutual duty between a married couple, where husband and wife pleasured each other equally, but where sex was considered a private affair, at least by followers of the aforementioned Indian religions. It seems that polygamy was allowed during ancient times. In practice, this seems to have only been practiced by rulers, with common people maintaining a monogamous marriage. It is common in many cultures for a ruling class to practice both polyandry and polygyny as a way of preserving dynastic succession.

Nudity in art was considered acceptable in southern India, as shown by the paintings at Ajanta and the sculptures of the time. It is likely that as in most countries with tropical climates, Indians from some regions did not need to wear clothes, and other than for fashion, there was no practical need to cover the upper half of the body. This is supported by historical evidence, which shows that men in many parts of ancient India mostly dressed only the lower half of their bodies with clothes and upper part of body was covered by gold and precious stones, jewellery, while women used to wear traditional sarees made of silk and expensive clothes as a symbol of their wealth.

As Indian civilisation further developed and the writing of the Upanishads around 500 BCE, it was somewhere between the 1st and 6th centuries that the Kama Sutra, originally known as Vatsyayana Kamasutram ('Vatsyayana's Aphorisms on Love'), was written. This philosophical work on kama shastra, or 'science of love', was intended as both an exploration of human desire, including infidelity, and a technical guide to pleasing a sexual partner within a marriage. This is not the only example of such a work in ancient India, but is the most widely known in modern times. It is probably during this period that the text spread to ancient China, along with Buddhist scriptures, where Chinese versions were written.

It is also during 10th century to 12th century that some of India's most famous ancient works of art were produced, often freely depicting romantic themes and situations. Examples of this include the depiction of Apsaras, roughly equivalent to nymphs or sirens in European and Arabic mythology, on some ancient temples. The best and most famous example of this can be seen at the Khajuraho complex in central India built around 9th to 12th century.

Colonial-era 

A number of movements were set up by prominent citizens, such as the Brahmo Samaj in Bengal and the Prarthana Samaj in Bombay Presidency, to work for the 'reform' of Indian private and public life. While this new consciousness led to the promotion of education for women and (eventually) a raise in the age of consent and reluctant acceptance of remarriage for widows, it also produced a puritanical attitude to sex even within marriage and the home.

Current issues 
Conservative views of sexuality are now the norm in the modern republic of India, and South Asia in general. It is often argued that this is partly related to the effect of colonial influence, as well as to the puritanical elements of Islam in countries like Pakistan (e.g. the Islamic revivalist movements, which has influenced many Muslims in Pakistan and Bangladesh). However, such views were also prevalent in the pre-colonial era, especially since the advent of Islam in India which brought purdah as ideal for Muslim women. Before the gradual spread of Islam largely through the influence of Sufis, there seems to be evidence of liberal attitudes towards sexuality and nudity in art. However, scholars debate the degree to which Islam, as a mass and the varied phenomenon was responsible for this shift.

While during the 1960s and 1970s in the west, many people discovered the ancient culture of sexual liberalism in India as a source for western free love movements, and neo-Tantric philosophy, India itself is currently the more prudish culture, embodying Victorian sensibilities that were abandoned decades ago in their country of origin. However, with increased exposure to world culture due to globalisation, and the proliferation of progressive ideas due to greater education and wealth, India is beginning to go through a western-style sexual revolution of its own, especially in cosmopolitan cities.

One of the current issue regarding sexuality in India is that alternative sexualities and ideas of belonging to LGBT community is still considered a taboo. Homosexuality was finally decriminalised in India in 2018 after a recriminalisation effort in 2013.

Modern India

Modern issues that affect India, as part of the sexual revolution, have become points of argument between conservative and liberal forces, such as political parties and religious pressure groups. These issues are also matters of ethical importance in a nation where freedom and equality are guaranteed in the constitution.

Scholarship by Indian sociologist Jyoti Puri calls attention to the social control around middle-class women's bodies in urban India and how politics of gender and sexuality impact of nationalist and transnational discourses and the role of nation-state. Her third book Sexual States: Governance and the Struggle Against the Antisodomy Law in India’s Present, tracks the efforts to decriminalize homosexuality in India.

Sexuality in popular entertainment 
 The entertainment industry is an important part of modern India, and is expressive of Indian society in general. Historically, Indian television and film has lacked the frank depiction of sex; until recently, even kissing scenes were considered taboo. On the other hand, rape scenes or scenes showing sexual assault were shown. Currently, some Indian states show soft-core sexual scenes and nudity in films, whilst other areas do not. Mainstream films are still largely catered to the masses.

Some recent movies like Ek Ladki Ko Dekha Toh Aisa Laga, Shubh Mangal Zyada Saavdhan, Badhaai Do help bring the concepts of alternative sexualities and LGBT inclusion in the popular culture.

Pornography 

The distribution and production of pornography are both illegal in India; however, accessing pornography in private is not. Regardless, softcore films have been common since the late 1970s, and many directors have produced them. Magazine publications like Debonair (magazine), Fantasy, Chastity, Royal Magazine, and Dafa 302 exist in India, and more than 50 million Indians are believed to see porn on a daily basis.

The Information Technology Act, Chapter XI Paragraph 67, the Government of India clearly considers the transmission of pornography through any electronic medium as a punishable offence. The CEO of the Indian subsidiary of eBay was charged with various criminal offences for allowing the trading of a CD on the website that contained pornography.

Sex industry 

While trade in sex was frowned upon in ancient India, it was tolerated and regulated so as to reduce the damage that it could do. However, the stigmatisation that has arisen in modern times has left the many poor sex workers with problems of exploitation and rampant infection, including AIDS, and worse, it has allowed a huge human-trafficking industry, like that of Eastern Europe, to take hold. Many poor, young women are kidnapped from villages and sold into sexual slavery. There have been some recent efforts to regulate the Indian sex industry.

A supreme court order in May, 2022 upheld prostitution as a profession ruling that sex workers had the same human rights as any other citizen of India and thus they can not be discriminated or arrested for their profession.

See also  
 History of human sexuality
 Hinduism and sexual orientation
 Homosexuality in India
 Homosexuality and Hinduism
 Homosexuality and Sikhism
 Kamashastra
 Non-westernized concepts of male sexuality

References

Further reading 

Alain Daniélou. The Complete Kama Sutra: The First Unabridged Modern Translation of the Classic Indian Text. Inner Traditions,1993 . 
Doniger, Wendy. "The Mare's Trap, Nature and Culture in The Kama Sutra." Speaking Tiger, 2015. .
The Continent of Circe by Nirad C. Chaudhuri – this has a chapter devoted to the topic.
CIOTTI, MANUELA. "'The Bourgeois Woman and the Half-Naked One': Or the Indian Nation's Contradictions Personified." Modern Asian Studies, vol. 44, no. 4, 2010, pp. 785–815. .
Chanana, Karuna. "Hinduism and Female Sexuality: Social Control and Education of Girls in India." Sociological Bulletin, vol. 50, no. 1, Indian Sociological Society, 2001, pp. 37–63, .
Crane, Ralph, and Radhika Mohanram. "The Missionary's Position: Love and Passion in Anglo-India." In Imperialism as Diaspora: Race, Sexuality, and History in Anglo-India, NED-New edition, 1, 1., 13:83–107. Liverpool University Press, 2013. .
Rao, Vidya. "'Thumri' as Feminine Voice". Economic and Political Weekly, vol. 25, no. 17, 1990, pp. WS31–WS39. .
Tripathi, Laxminarayan. "Me Hijra, Me Laxmi." Oxford University Press, 2015. . Translated from the Marathi original by R. Raj Rao and P. G. Joshi. 
Revathi, A. "The Truth About Me, A Hijra Life Story." Penguin Books, India, 2010. . Translated from Tamil by V. Geetha. 
Vanita, Ruth. "love's rite, Same-Sex marriage in India and The West." Palgrave Macmillan, 2005. .
Narrain, Arvind. "Queer." BOOKS for CHANGE, 2004. ISBN 81-87380-91-8.
Urban, Hugh B. "'From Sex To Superconsciousness': Sexuality, Tantra, and Liberation in 1970s India." Zorba the Buddha: Sex, Spirituality, and Capitalism in the Global Osho Movement, 1st ed., University of California Press, 2015, pp. 76–100, .
Parkinson, R.B.. "A Little Gay History." The British Museum Press, 2013. . 
Edited by Sangari, Kumkum and Vaid, Sudesh. "Recasting Women, Essays in Colonial History." Zubaan Publishers Pvt. Ltd., 2003. . 
Edited by Dasgupta, Rohit and Gokulsing, K. Moti. "Masculinity and Its Challenges in India." Mcfarland & Company, Inc., Publishers. 2041. .
George, Annie. "Embodying Identity through Heterosexual Sexuality: Newly Married Adolescent Women in India". Culture, Health & Sexuality, vol. 4, no. 2, Taylor & Francis, Ltd., 2002, pp. 207–22, .
Ahluwalia, Sanjam. "Demographic Rhetoric and Sexual Surveillance: Indian Middle-Class Advocates of Birth Control, 1877–1947". Reproductive Restraints: Birth Control in India, 1877–1947, University of Illinois Press, 2008, pp. 23–53, .
Dell, Heather S. "'Ordinary' Sex, Prostitutes, and Middle-Class Wives: Liberalization and National Identity in India". Sex in Development: Science, Sexuality, and Morality in Global Perspective, edited by VINCANNE ADAMS and STACY LEIGH PIGG, Duke University Press, 2005, pp. 187–206, .
Pechilis, Karen. Review of Progress toward an Open Discussion of Sexuality in India and Asia, by Moni Nag, Geetanjali Misra, and Radhika Chandiramani. The Journal of Sex Research 44, no. 4 (2007): 401–4. .
Espinosa-Hernández G, Choukas-Bradley S, van de Bongardt D, Van Dulmen M. Romantic relationships and sexuality in diverse adolescent populations: Introduction to the special issue. J Adolesc. 2020 Aug;83:95–99. . Epub 2020 Aug 4. .
Govind N, Chowkhani K. Integrating concerns of gender, sexuality and marital status in the medical curriculum. Indian J Med Ethics. 2020 Apr-Jun; V(2):92–94. . .
Sharma MK, Rao GN, Benegal V, Thennarasu K, Oommen D. Use of pornography in India: Need to explore its implications. Natl Med J India. 2019 Sep-Oct; 32(5):282–284. . .
Gruskin S, Yadav V, Castellanos-Usigli A, Khizanishvili G, Kismödi E. Sexual health, sexual rights and sexual pleasure: meaningfully engaging the perfect triangle. Sex Reprod Health Matters. 2019 Dec; 27(1):1593787. . ; .
Setia MS, Brassard P, Jerajani HR, Bharat S, Gogate A, Kumta S, Row-Kavi A, Anand V, Boivin JF. Men who have sex with men in India: a systematic review of the literature. J LGBT Health Res. 2008;4(2–3):51–70. . .
Gupta C. Writing sex and sexuality: archives of colonial North India. J Womens Hist. 2011;23(4):12–35. . .
Vanita R. Lesbian studies and activism in India. J Lesbian Stud. 2007;11(3–4):243–53. . .
Bowling J, Blekfeld-Sztraky D, Simmons M, Dodge B, Sundarraman V, Lakshmi B, Dharuman SD, Herbenick D. Definitions of sex and intimacy among gender and sexual minoritised groups in urban India. Cult Health Sex. 2020 May;22(5):520-534. . Epub 2019 May 30. .
Bowling J, Dodge B, Bindra N, Dave B, Sharma R, Sundarraman V, Thirupathur Dharuman S, Herbenick D. Female condom acceptability in urban India: Examining the role of sexual pleasure. J Health Psychol. 2018 Feb; 23(2):218–228. . Epub 2017 Dec 18. ; .
Banik S, Dodge B, Schmidt-Sane M, Sivasubramanian M, Bowling J, Rawat SM, Dange A, Anand V. Humanizing an Invisible Population in India: Voices from Bisexual Men Concerning Identity, Life Experiences, and Sexual Health. Arch Sex Behav. 2019 Jan; 48(1):305–316. . Epub 2018 Dec 3. ; .
Sharma SK, Vishwakarma D. Transitions in adolescent boys and young Men's high-risk sexual behaviour in India. BMC Public Health. 2020 Jul 11; 20(1):1089. . ; .
Siddiqui M, Kataria I, Watson K, Chandra-Mouli V. A systematic review of the evidence on peer education programmes for promoting the sexual and reproductive health of young people in India. Sex Reprod Health Matters. 2020 Dec; 28(1):1741494. . ; .

Bibliography  
 
 Das, K. and Rao, T. S. S. (2019) 'A Chronicle of Sexuality in the Indian Subcontinent', Journal of Psychosexual Health, 1(1), pp. 20–25.  
 
 Mamta Gupta (1994) Sexuality in the Indian subcontinent, Sexual and Marital Therapy, 9:1, 57–69,  
 Abraham, Leena, and K. Anil Kumar. "Sexual Experiences and Their Correlates Among College Students in Mumbai City, India." International Family Planning Perspectives, vol. 25, no. 3, Guttmacher Institute, 1999, pp. 139–52,  
 Das, Vishnupriya. "Dating Applications, Intimacy, and Cosmopolitan Desire in India." Global Digital Cultures: Perspectives from South Asia, edited by ASWIN PUNATHAMBEKAR and SRIRAM MOHAN, University of Michigan Press, 2019, pp. 125–41,

External links 
 BBC Article on AIDS Awareness in India
 Indian Sex Life Survey - Average Ages, Statistics on Foreplay, Intercourse & Frequency, Extramarital & Premarital Data, Homosexuality in Indian Society and other such related issues
 History of Sex: Ancient India
 IASSTD & AIDS - Indian Association for the Study of Sexually Transmitted Diseases & AIDS
 India In World Sex Survey - Frequency of sex in India & other data
 The Pink Panties Campaign: The Indian Women's Sexual Revolution. Intersections: Gender and Sexuality in Asia and the Pacific Issue 23, January 2010

 
 
 
  

 
 
Sex
India